The 2010–11 South West Peninsula League season was the fourth in the history of the South West Peninsula League, a football competition in England, that feeds the Premier Division of the Western Football League. The league had been formed in 2007 from the merger of the Devon County League and the South Western League, and is restricted to clubs based in Cornwall and Devon. The Premier Division of the South West Peninsula League is on the same level of the National League System as the Western League Division One.

The champions for the second season in succession were Buckland Athletic.

Premier Division

The Premier Division featured 20 teams, the same as the previous season. Two new clubs joined the league after Clyst Rovers resigned and Holsworthy were relegated to Division One West:

Royal Marines, champions of Division One East.
St Austell, runners-up in Division One West.

League table

Division One East
Division One East consisted of sixteen clubs, reduced from eighteen the previous season.
Royal Marines were promoted to the Premier Division and Okehampton Argyle were transferred to Division One West. No new clubs joined the division.
Galmpton United & Torbay Gents shortened their name to Galmpton Gents.

Division One West
Division One West consisted of sixteen clubs, reduced from seventeen the previous season.
St Austell were promoted to the Premier Division, and Wendron CC United and Millbrook left the league. Holsworthy were relegated from the Premier Division and Okehampton Argyle were transferred from Division One East. After this season, they were transferred back again.

References

External links
 South West Peninsula League

South West Peninsula League
South West